Filip Olsson (born ) is a Swedish ice hockey defenceman currently playing in Mörrums IK of the Division 1. Olsson has also played in Sweden's national junior team, both U18 and U19, and in AIK's elite team in Elitserien. His youth team is Flemingsbergs IK.

References 
 

Living people
1991 births
AIK IF players
Swedish ice hockey defencemen
Ice hockey people from Stockholm